The Serie B 1956–57 was the twenty-fifth tournament of this competition played in Italy since its creation.

Teams
Venezia and Sambenedettese had been promoted from Serie C, while Novara and Pro Patria had been relegated from Serie A.

Final classification

Results

Promotion tie-breaker

Alessandria promoted to Serie A.

References and sources
Almanacco Illustrato del Calcio - La Storia 1898-2004, Panini Edizioni, Modena, September 2005

Serie B seasons
2
Italy